{{DISPLAYTITLE:C12H15N5O3}}
The molecular formula C12H15N5O3 (molar mass: 277.28 g/mol, exact mass: 277.1175 u) may refer to:

 Entecavir (ETV)
 Queuine (Q)